Censorship in Japan has taken many forms throughout the history of the country. While Article 21 of the Constitution of Japan guarantees freedom of expression and prohibits formal censorship, effective censorship of obscene content does exist and is justified by the Article 175 of the Criminal Code of Japan. Historically, the law has been interpreted in different ways—recently it has been interpreted to mean that all pornography must be at least partly censored, and a few arrests has been made based on this law.

As of 2022, Japan is ranked 71st on the Press Freedom Index, down from 67th in the previous year.  Reporters Without Borders has noted that issues concerning Japan include self-censorship among its journalists, the national media broadcaster NHK maintaining close ties to the ruling Liberal Democratic Party (LDP), as well as the exclusion of freelancers and foreign reporters in government events and interviews, fueling doubts about editorial independence. In 2022, an "online insults" law was introduced that would regulate the kind of speech made in the online public sphere.

History

Tokugawa/Edo Period 
As publishing became more popular in the Edo Period, the Tokugawa shogunate began to turn to censorship. During this period, the shogunate, or military government, had a constant policy to censor anything deemed as indecent by the government. Initial targets included Christianity, criticism of the shogunate, and information on the activities of the Tokugawa clan. With the Kansei Reforms, any material deemed to be disturbing the traditional way of life, as well as luxury publications, came under scrutiny. Under the Tempō Reforms, printing blocks of erotic literature, as well as the novels of Tamenaga Shunsui and Tanehiko Ryūtei were among those seized.

Their early bans focused on Christian books, military books (gunsho), mainly as a way to restrict regional Daimyo, feudal lord, from using Christianity as a political ideology and challenge the Bakufu's new rule while imposing their moral authority. As military and political instability settled, the shogunate turned their gaze on social unrest. They were noting an increase in civil disobedience and satirical criticism using literature and theater coming from ordinary people. An edict for publications guidelines were issued on Kyoho 7(1722)/11 with an outline of themes that were banned. In addition to literature, the Shogunate also placed limitations on kabuki theater actors. The shogunate prohibited women and children from appearing in plays, but this law was often ignored by theater houses. These new laws resulted in the rise of male actors who would specialize in female roles called onnagata.

Meiji Period and the Pacific War 

After the Meiji Restoration in 1868, which marked a major political shift in Japan, the government began heavy censorship of Western ideas, pornography and any political writings critical of the Emperor of Japan and government, wanting to control the spread of information. Censorship of materials increased from this point, often using ongoing wars to increase police penalties. In 1930, the death penalty was added to the list of punishments deemed acceptable for certain violations. The new Bureau had complete control over all news, advertising and public events. The following year revision of the  eliminated freedom of the press entirely, doing things such as forcing papers in each prefecture to either merge into one paper or cease publication, with all articles by the paper having to be screened by government censors before they could be published.

Occupation of Japan

After the surrender of Japan in 1945, the Supreme Commander of the Allied Powers abolished all forms of censorship and controls on freedom of speech. Article 21 of the Constitution of Japan was later integrated in 1947 to guarantee that the Japanese had the freedom to associate with each other and express their thoughts freely. However, press censorship remained a reality during the occupation of Japan, especially in matters of pornography, and in political matters deemed subversive by the American government. Publications submitted by the press were monitored for criticisms about democracy or the problems such as starvation the Japanese citizens experienced during the occupation in the form of regulations set by The Press Code of 1945.

Censorship of certain events related to the Allied forces left various groups of Japanese citizens to be subjected to discrimination by their peers. Hibakusha experienced life-altering physical changes as a result of the radiation they were exposed to and the lack of press explaining the effects of radiation poisoning made it difficult for Hibakusha to fit in. Unable to speak out against the results of the atomic bombs and to assimilate with other Japanese citizens, most Hibakusha had to live in isolation within the homes of their family.

The three organizations established by the Supreme Commander of the Allied Powers and who were tasked with upholding press censorship were the Civil Communications Section (CCS), the Civil Censorship Detachment (CCD), and the Civil Information and Education Section (CIE). The CCS focused on monitoring what was being broadcast to the Japanese people while the CCD monitored printed and filmed works to ensure that no form of media was spreading messages against democracy. The CIE on the other hand, was primarily used to educate Japanese publishers and producers on how to integrate prodemocratic values into their publications to boost support for the new government.

According to Donald Keene:
Not only did Occupation censorship forbid criticism of the United States or other Allied nations, but the mention of censorship itself was forbidden. This means, as Donald Keene observes, that for some producers of texts "the Occupation censorship was even more exasperating than Japanese military censorship had been because it insisted that all traces of censorship be concealed. This meant that articles had to be rewritten in full, rather than merely submitting XXs for the offending phrases".
—Dawn to the West

Pornographic censorship 

The sale and distribution of pornography in Japan is restricted under Article 175 of the Criminal Code (1907), which states the following:

The article was amended in 2011 to include "recording media containing [obscene] electronic or magnetic records", as well as materials distributed by electronic means.

The definition of "obscenity", which is absent from the text of the code itself, has developed through a series of judicial decisions. In the 1957 , the Supreme Court of Japan upheld the convictions of translator Sei Itō and editor Kyujiro Koyama, who were accused of violating the law with their 1950 publication of D. H. Lawrence's erotic novel Lady Chatterley's Lover. In its opinion, the Court cited a three-part test for obscenity previously established by the Supreme Court of Judicature in 1928; under this test, a work is considered obscene if it "arouses and stimulates sexual desire, offends a common sense of modesty or shame, and violates proper concepts of sexual morality". Due to this legal interpretation, the majority of pornography produced in Japan undergoes self-censorship; the primary means are digital mosaics and/or censor bars placed over genitalia.

The first film after World War II to be prosecuted on obscenity charges was Black Snow, a 1965 pink film directed by Tetsuji Takechi and produced by Nikkatsu. The politically and sexually explicit film, which depicts the lives of prostitutes on the outskirts of a US military base in Tokyo, was ruled as "not obscene" by the Tokyo District Court in 1966. The lower court held that the defendants, Takechi and Nikkatsu distributor chief Satoru Murakami, were not culpable because the film had successfully passed Eirin, Japan's self-regulating movie regulator. The ruling was upheld in 1969 at the Tokyo High Court, which deemed that the film was obscene but acquitted the pair on the basis of the approval the film had received from Eirin. The rulings were followed in 1972 by a series of prosecutions against Nikkatsu's Roman Porno film series, which similarly ended in acquittals of Nikkatsu employees in 1978 and 1980 on the basis of Eirin approvals.

In January 2004, Yūji Suwa, Motonori Kishi, and Kōichi Takada were prosecuted for producing and distributing the hentai manga anthology Misshitsu, in the first manga-related obscenity trial in Japan. Police reports found the depictions of "genitalia and scenes of sexual intercourse" within the manga to have been "drawn in detail and realistically", and that the censor bars meant to obscure genitalia and sexual penetration were "less conservative" than usual. Suwa and Takada pled guilty and were fined ¥500,000 each (about US$4,700), with Kishi receiving a one-year suspended prison sentence. After appealing to the Tokyo High Court, Kishi's sentence was reduced to a 1.5 million yen fine (about US$13,750). He then appealed the case to the Supreme Court, arguing that Article 175 violated Article 21 of the Constitution of Japan and its protection of freedom of expression. In its 2007 decision, the Court upheld the guilty verdict, concluding that Misshitsu satisfied the three-part obscenity test and was therefore subject to restriction. After the convictions of Kishi and Suwa, a number of retail bookstores in Japan removed their adults-only section, a phenomenon attributed to the chilling effect of the outcome.

In July 2013, three people related to Core Magazine, a Japanese publishing company focused on adult material, were arrested for selling "obscene images" with "insufficient censoring". They later pleaded guilty in December.

Internet censorship

Internet censorship in Japan generally focuses on pornography and controversial political material especially in regards to Japanese history during the Empire of Japan.

In 2022, Japan introduced a law to revise its Penal Code that would mandate a jail time for up to a year and a larger fine for making "online insults". Previously, insult charges apply when it is established that an "individual has insulted another in the public sphere to damage their social reputation". The penalty applied to the crime under the pre-revised law were "detention for less than 30 days" or "a fine of less than 10,000 yen.

See also
 Computer Entertainment Rating Organization—a Japanese rating organization for video games
 Constitution of Japan § Individual rights
 Eirin—the Japanese film rating organization
 Japanese history textbook controversies
 Kotobagari—self-censorship and euphemisms 
 Kisha club—restrictive journalist clubs that allows only established news organisations to access government events and to interview officials
 Nanjing Massacre denial
 Nihon Ethics of Video Association (NEVA)—a Japanese rating organization for videos
 Tokyo Metropolitan Ordinance Regarding the Healthy Development of Youths—the Tokyo law that regulates young people's access to "harmful" publications
 Uyoku dantai ("right wing groups")

References

Further reading 
 
  Covers the history of censorship legal cases in Japan.
  Despite the title, this also covers censorship prior to 1868–1945.
 
  Abstract. File archive.
 
 
 
 
 
  Updates the story of "Bill 156", which revised the Tokyo Youth Healthy Development Ordinance in 2011.
   A history and how-to analysis.
 
  Covers live-action films and videos, especially pornography, with a short section on the history of censorship in Japan.

External links
 Japanese Press Translations 1945–46 from Dartmouth College Library digital collections

 
Human rights abuses in Japan